Real Bloomsbury is a 2010 local oral history book by Nicholas Murray, on the district of Bloomsbury, in the  London Borough of Camden

Synopsis
Murray walks around the historic and fascinating square mile of the Bloomsbury area among locals, students and tourists, alone or in the company of local characters. Bloomsbury is an area 'crammed with history and with contemporary decision-making', the home of the influential left-wing Bloomsbury Group and Bloomsbury Publishing along with the British Museum, University College London and the Great Ormond Street Hospital. Bloomsbury has been a home of intellectuals, agitators and also working-class and now British Bengali communities.
The book is described as 'presenting Bloomsbury as it's never been portrayed before: intimate, contemporary, exploratory and occasionally downright strange.'

Reception
In The Independent William Parker described the book as ' amiably informative and well-illustrated...the ideal companion to any tour' and noted 'there has always been a tradition of radical political and religious belief in Bloomsbury' while the book was also previewed in the Camden New Journal and was listed as the best book about London of 2010

References

2010 non-fiction books
Books about London
Oral history books
History books about London
Bloomsbury